Irma Grigorievna Vitovskaya (Ukrainian: Irma Grigorivna Vitovska, real name Irina Grigorievna Vitovskaya; born December 30, 1974, Ivano-Frankivsk) is a Ukrainian theater and film actress, producer and public figure. Honored Artist of Ukraine (2016). Works at the Young Theater (since 1998), best known for her role as Lesya in the TV series Lesya + Roma (2005-2007).

Biography 
She was born on December 30, 1974, in Ivano-Frankivsk. Irma's father came from the village of Medukha, Galich district, Ivano-Frankivsk region. Maternal great-grandfather is Russian, and his wife is Latvian.

She dreamed of becoming an archaeologist, for several years in a row she tried to enter the Carpathian Institute. Stefanik. She attended a theater group at the Palace of Pioneers in Ivano-Frankivsk.

In 1998 she graduated from the Lviv State Musical Institute with a degree in Drama Theater Actress (course of Bohdan Kozak). Since the same year he has been working at the Kiev Academic Young Theatre.

Repeated participant of many international theater festivals, received personal awards.

Since October 11, 2015, he has been the coach of the Little Giants show on the 1 + 1 channel. She was the host of the TV shows "Marriage Games, or Number for the newlyweds" (Ukrainian: "Sweetheart games, or number for young people" "Home games, or number for young people") and "People's Star" (Ukrainian: "Narodna Zirka" "People's Zirka" ) on the ICTV channel. She took part in the vocal show "People's Star" on the TV channel "Ukraine".

Political Position 
Irma Vitovskaya is an activist of the "Revolution of Dignity" and "Language Maidan", a participant in all pro-Ukrainian protests.

In June 2018, she recorded a video message in support of Ukrainian director Oleg Sentsov, imprisoned in Russia.

Charity 
Irma Vitovskaya has been a participant in the social and public programs "Street Children" since 2007 and "Stop Bill" since 2011.

In 2014, Irma Vitovskaya started making motanka dolls, selling them, and donates the proceeds to help the army. The most expensive cost 2000 hryvnia. These funds were used to purchase underpants for the Coast Guard and plastic prayer cards for the Fifth Battalion.

With Irena Karpa, Irma Vitovskaya raised money at a creative evening for shoes for the battalion of the Ukrainian Volunteer Corps "Right Sector".

Irma Vitovskaya, as a member of the StopBill movement, initiated and starred in the Oscar and the Pink Lady art project, created to raise funds for the needs of terminally ill children. The premiere of the performance took place on October 7 in Ivano-Frankivsk and on October 11 in Kiev, received several theatrical awards and raised more than 700 thousand hryvnias for palliative children's departments, as well as mobile teams that will work with such children.

Irma Vitovskaya donated most of her fee for filming in the TV series “Robbery Like a Woman” for the treatment of the wounded in the ATO.

Private Life 

 First husband - Vladimir Kokotunov (born May 1, 1969), actor of the Young Theater
 Son - Orest Kokotunov-Vitovsky (born March 29, 2011)
 The second husband is Vitaliy Vantsa (born 1978), a businessman from Borislav, Lviv region.
 Irma's younger sister, Natalya, is married to lawyer Stanislav Lieberman, the brother of singer Tina Karol.

Theater works

Kyiv National Academic Molodyy Theatre 

 1980 - "Chasing Two Hares" by M. Staritsky; Director Viktor Shulakov - Frantiha / Cinema Star (introduction)
 1985 - "Ash Chicken" by Vladimir Orlov; director Viktor Shulakov - Frog (input)
 1991 - "The King and the Carrot, or everything is like in a fairy tale" by Vladislav Ksheminsky; director Ya. Kozlov - Herold
 1998 - "Baby" by J. de Letraz; director Vladimir Begma - Lulu / Kristin
 1999 - "REKHUVILIYZOR" by N. Gogol and N. Kulish; director Stanislav Moiseev - Maria Antonovna
 2000 - "The Little Mermaid" by L. Razumovskaya by H. Andersen; director - Evgeny Kurman - The Little Mermaid
 2000 - "Seville engagement" by R. Sheridan; director Evgeny Kurman - Clara / Lauretta
 2000 - "The Tragedy of Hamlet, Prince of Denmark" by W. Shakespeare; director Stanislav Moiseev - actress
 2000 - "Kaidashi" by Natalia Dubina after I. Nechuy-Levitsky; director Nikolai Yaremko - Melashka
 2001 - "Steel Will" by M. Kurochkin; director Dmitry Bogomazov - Stalova Volya
 2002 - "The Wizard of the Emerald City" by F. Baum, A. Volkov; director G. Vorotchenko - Ellie
 2002 - "Dance of Love" by A. Schnitzler; director Stanislav Moiseev - Grisette
 2004 - "Pickled Aristocrat" by Irena Koval; director Stanislav Moiseev - Wife
 2006 - "Moskoviada" by Y. Andrukhovych; director Stanislav Moiseev - Galya
 2007 - "The Fourth Sister" by J. Glovatsky; director Stanislav Moiseev - Katya
 2009 - "Torchalov" by Nikita Voronov; director Stanislav Moiseev - Lizaveta
 2014 - "Deceit and love" by F. Schiller; director Andrey Bilous - Miller's wife
 2015 - "Stalkers" by Pavel Arye; director Stas Zhirkov - woman Prisya
 2017 - "Massacre" by Y. Reza; director Vlad Belozorenko - Annette Rey
 "Marriage" by N. Gogol; director Taras Krivoruchenko - Dunyasha
 "Women and War" by Javad el Essedi; directed by Jawad el Essedi - Rahman
 "The Life of the Simple" by Natatya Vorozhbit; director Y. Sidorenko - Lyuba-2

Other Theaters 

 2007 - "It's so easy to help, or Where do children come from?" A. Kryma; director Vitaly Malakhov (charity project-performance)
 2015 - "Oscar and the Pink Lady" by E. Schmitt; director Rostislav Derzhipolsky (charitable theater project)
 2017 - "Hamlet" (neo-opera of horrors) based on W. Shakespeare, translated by Yuri Andrukhovych; dir. Rostislav Derzhipolsky (Ukrainian) Russian — Gertrude's Queen of Denmark, Hamlet's mother (Ivano-Frankivsk Regional Academic Music and Drama Theater named after I. Franko)

Filmography

Actress

Animation 

 2004 - Orphan Fox - Fox
 2005 - Mountain of gems (Series "Sinister (Ukrainian)") - Marichka
 Teletubbies - Lala
 2008 - Volt - cat Marquise
 2009 - Cloudy with a Chance of Meatballs
 2012 - The Lorax - Ted's mother
 2013 - Cloudy with a Chance of Meatballs - 2
 2014 - Babai - witch

Awards and nomination 

 2001 - nomination of the Kiev Pectoral award in the category "Best Actress" (The Little Mermaid in the play "The Little Mermaid")
 2006 - nomination "Acting talent" at the Best Ukrainian Awards
 2006 - "Teletriumph" in the nomination for the best TV series "Lesya + Roma"
 2012 - "Teletriumph" in the nomination "Actress of a television film / series (female role)"
 2015 - Laureate of the Kiev Pectoral Award in the category "Best Actress" (Baba Prisya in the play "Stalkers" of the joint project of the Golden Gate Theater and the Young Theatre)
 2015 — national competition "Charitable Ukraine-2015" for the play "Oscar and the Pink Lady"
 2016 - Honored Artist of Ukraine
 2018 — laureate of the Kinokolo award, the best actress of 2018. Brahma, dir. V. Quiet
 2018 — laureate of "Woman of the Year 2018"
 2018 - winner of the "Gold Dziga" best female role
 2018 — laureate of "Women in art" category "theater and cinema" from the UN and "Ukrainian Institute"
 2019 - laureate of the "Golden Duke" at the OIFF. Best acting work "My thoughts, quiet"
 2019 - "Kіnokolo" best actress for "My thoughts are quiet"
 2021 — entered the top 100 successful women of Ukraine according to Novoye vryamya magazine.

References 

Lviv Conservatory alumni
Recipients of the title of Merited Artist of Ukraine
Ukrainian television presenters
21st-century actresses
Ukrainian actresses
Living people
1974 births